Dmitry Igorievich Ogloblin (born February 24, 1956, in Lesnoy) is a former Soviet speedskater.

World records 

Source: SpeedSkatingStats.com

References 

 Dmitry Ogloblin at SpeedSkatingStats.com

External links

1956 births
Living people
Soviet male speed skaters
Speed skaters at the 1980 Winter Olympics
Olympic speed skaters of the Soviet Union
People from Lesnoy, Sverdlovsk Oblast
World record setters in speed skating
Sportspeople from Sverdlovsk Oblast